Kim Chun-ok (born 6 March 1973) is a North Korean diver. She competed in the women's 10 metre platform event at the 1992 Summer Olympics.

References

1973 births
Living people
North Korean female divers
Olympic divers of North Korea
Divers at the 1992 Summer Olympics
Place of birth missing (living people)
Asian Games medalists in diving
Divers at the 1990 Asian Games
Asian Games silver medalists for North Korea
Medalists at the 1990 Asian Games
20th-century North Korean women